Florentine bronze is a modern term for an alloy usually formed as a mixture of aluminium or tin (<10%) and copper (>90%). Currently no chemical formula for Florentine bronze has been made as it is an alloy which is not standardised (in proportions) worldwide.
 
"Florentine bronze" bears no relation to the 16th century bronze reductions of full-scale sculptures that were made in Florence after models by Giambologna and other Mannerist sculptors, to satisfy a collectors' market.

Copper alloys
Bronze